Visuvasingam Edirmannasingham was a Ceylon Tamil member of the Legislative Council of Ceylon.

Edirmannasingham was the son of Manapillai Visuvasingam from Inuvil in northern Ceylon. He was appointed to the Legislative Council of Ceylon in 1846 as the unofficial member representing Tamils, replacing Simon Casie Chetty.

References

Members of the Legislative Council of Ceylon
People from Northern Province, Sri Lanka
People from British Ceylon
Sri Lankan Tamil politicians
Year of birth missing
Year of death missing